Marion Township is one of 20 townships in Allen County, Indiana, United States. As of the 2010 census, its population was 3,858.

History
In September, 1834, the Commissioners of Allen County created Root Township, which embraced all of present-day Marion Township, as well as a portion of present-day Adams County. Adams County was created on February 7, 1835, leaving only a portion of Root Township still in Allen County. In August, 1835, this remainder of Root Township was reorganized and renamed Marion Township.

Geography

Unincorporated towns
 Hessen Cassel at 
 Middletown at 
 Poe at 
 Soest at 40.996157°N 85.037435°W
(This list is based in part on USGS data and may include former settlements.)

Adjacent townships
 Adams Township (north)
 Jefferson Township (northeast)
 Madison Township (east)
 Root Township, Adams County (southeast)
 Preble Township, Adams County (south)
 Jefferson Township, Wells County (southwest)
 Pleasant Township (west)
 Wayne Township (northwest)

Cemeteries
The township contains the following cemeteries: Antioch Lutheran, Bethel Baptist (defunct), Coleman family (defunct), Emmanuel Lutheran, Hall (disappeared), Morton family (defunct), Poe/Williamsport, St. John's Lutheran (defunct), St. Joseph Hessen Cassel Roman Catholic, St. Paul's Lutheran (defunct), and Thompson family (defunct).

Major highways

Rivers
 St. Marys River

School districts
 East Allen County Schools

Political districts
 Indiana's 3rd congressional district
 State House District 79
 State Senate District 19

References

Citations

References
 United States Census Bureau 2008 TIGER/Line Shapefiles
 United States Board on Geographic Names (GNIS)
 IndianaMap

Townships in Allen County, Indiana
Fort Wayne, IN Metropolitan Statistical Area
Townships in Indiana